Pilostyles is a genus of flowering plants in the family Apodanthaceae. It includes about 11 species of very small, completely parasitic plants that live inside the stems of woody legumes. Plants of this genus are sometimes referred to as stemsuckers.

The plants completely lack stems, roots, leaves, and chlorophyll. While not flowering, they do not resemble most plants, living entirely inside the host as " [...] a mycelium-like endophyte formed by strands of parenchyma cells that are in close contact to the host vasculature". Their presence is only noticeable when the flowers emerge out of the stems of the host plant.

Pilostyles is dioecious, with separate male and female plants. Male and female plants are not commonly known to inhabit the same host. Flowers are two or three millimeters wide and in some species each female flower can produce over 100 seeds, which are less than 1mm long. 

Species are found in several countries, with a discontinuous distribution: species have been found in the United States, Mexico, Venezuela, Iran, Syria, and Australia.

Species include:
Pilostyles aethiopica Welw.
Pilostyles berteroi Guill.
Pilostyles blanchetii (Gardner) R.Br.
Pilostyles boyacensis F.Gonzáles & Pabón-Mora
Pilostyles coccoidea K.R.Thiele
Pilostyles collina Dell
Pilostyles hamiltonii C.A.Gardner
Pilostyles haussknechtii Boiss.
Pilostyles maya P.Ortega, Gonz.-Martínez & S.Vásquez
Pilostyles mexicana (Brandegee) Rose
Pilostyles thurberi A.Gray
The genus was formerly considered a member of Rafflesiaceae, and was re-classified after new DNA evidence

References

External links

Jepson Manual Treatment: Pilostyles
Parasitic Plant Connection: Apodanthaceae

Apodanthaceae
Parasitic plants
Cucurbitales genera
Dioecious plants